Barisha, Bariša or Baricha  may refer to:
 Barisha, Harem District, a village in Idlib Governorate, Syria
 Barisha, Kolkata, a residential locale in Calcutta
 Barisha, Jisr ash-Shugur, a village in Idlib Governorate, Syria
 Barisha, Latakia, a village in Latakia Governorate, Syria

See also 
 Barisa, a village in Papua New Guinea
 Barishah (disambiguation), villages in Kermanshah Province, Iran
 Barisho, a town in Kenya